In the coronary circulation, the posterior interventricular artery (PIV, PIA, or PIVA), most often called the posterior descending artery (PDA), is an artery running in the posterior interventricular sulcus to the apex of the heart where it meets with the anterior interventricular artery or also known as Left Anterior Descending artery. It supplies the posterior third of the interventricular septum. The remaining anterior two-thirds is supplied by the anterior interventricular artery which is a septal branch of the left anterior descending artery, which is a branch of left coronary artery.

It is typically a branch of the right coronary artery (70%, known as right dominance). Alternately, the PIV can be a branch of the circumflex coronary artery (10%, known as left dominance) which itself is a branch of the left coronary artery. It can also be supplied by an anastomosis of the left and right coronary artery (20%, known as co-dominance).

Variants have been reported.

The anatomical position of the artery is not really posterior, but inferior. The terminology posterior is based on viewing the heart from the "Valentine" position, not by the heart's actual position in the body.

Additional images

References

External links
  - "Posterior view of the heart."
 Image
 Image at guidant.com

Arteries of the thorax